My Sister and I was a British television series which aired in 1956. It was a sitcom produced by ABC Weekend TV at its Didsbury Studios in Manchester, and broadcast on ITV. The series was wiped, and none of the six episodes produced are known to still exist. Little information is available on the series.

Regular cast
Dinah Lee – Sally
Jane Taylor – Jo
Jack Howarth – Grandfather 
Ethel Manners – Mrs. Balshaw

References

External links
My Sister and I at IMDb

1956 British television series debuts
1956 British television series endings
1950s British sitcoms
ITV sitcoms
Black-and-white British television shows
English-language television shows
Lost television shows
Television shows produced by ABC Weekend TV